Borough of Bexley could refer to:

London Borough of Bexley, created 1965 and currently existing
Municipal Borough of Bexley, abolished 1965